Héctor Jonás Acevedo (born 6 February 1997) is an Argentine professional footballer who plays as a winger or midfielder for Patronato, on loan from Huracán.

Career
After youth spells with Atlético de Concarán, Sportivo Municipal and San Lorenzo, Acevedo began his senior career with San Lorenzo of the Argentine Primera División in 2018. He was selected on the substitutes bench for a fixture with Arsenal de Sarandí, in what was Diego Aguirre's final league game in charge of the club; Acevedo didn't feature. His professional debut arrived two months later under Claudio Biaggio, with the midfielder coming off the bench for the final sixteen minutes of a win over San Martín on 18 November. One further appearance followed against Atlético Tucumán in November, as San Lorenzo placed third.

In August 2019, Acevedo was loaned to Santamarina of Primera B Nacional. Fourteen appearances followed. In August 2020, Acevedo moved across the second tier to join Quilmes on loan.

On 29 June 2021, Acevedo was sold to Huracán. In July 2022, he joined fellow league club Patronato on loan for the rest of the year.

Career statistics
.

References

External links

1997 births
Living people
People from San Luis Province
Argentine footballers
Association football midfielders
Association football wingers
Argentine Primera División players
Primera Nacional players
San Lorenzo de Almagro footballers
Club y Biblioteca Ramón Santamarina footballers
Quilmes Atlético Club footballers
Club Atlético Huracán footballers
Club Atlético Patronato footballers